Index: Incident in a Museum is an extensive series of paintings produced between 1985 and 1988 by Michel Baldwin and Mel Ramsden, members of the British conceptual artists' collective Art & Language.

The Incident in a Museum series 
The Index: Incident in a Museum series includes many productions. Several of these works are paintings that represent an imaginary exhibition of Art & Language in the premises of the Whitney Museum in New York. This museum collecting only works produced by American artists the exhibition does not represent a true scene. Besides, the Art & Language works represented in these paintings do not exist as they are depicted in the paintings.

Through this series, Art & Language raises, among others, the issues of places of production and artistic consumption, and the modalities of representation and abstraction. This work appears to be an artistic investigation that at the end of the series seems to tend towards emptiness.

This series of works ends with works that are titled An Incident in a Museum: Study for Hostage, the then following series of paintings being called Hostage.

Bibliography

References 

1985 paintings
1986 paintings
1987 paintings
Art & Language